Niko Janković (born 25 August 2001) is a Croatian professional footballer who plays as a winger for HNL club Rijeka, on loan from Dinamo Zagreb.

References

External links

2001 births
Living people
Footballers from Zagreb
Association football forwards
Croatian footballers
GNK Dinamo Zagreb players
GNK Dinamo Zagreb II players
NK Slaven Belupo players
HNK Gorica players
HŠK Zrinjski Mostar players
HNK Rijeka players
Croatian Football League players
Premier League of Bosnia and Herzegovina players
Expatriate footballers in Bosnia and Herzegovina
Croatian expatriate sportspeople in Bosnia and Herzegovina